Denis Andrew Robert "Sonny" Moloney (11 August 1910 – 15 July 1942) was a New Zealand cricketer who played three Tests on New Zealand's 1937 tour of England. He was killed in the First Battle of El Alamein during the Second World War.

Moloney was born in Dunedin and educated at Otago Boys' High School, where he represented the school at cricket, rugby and athletics. A middle-order or opening batsman and leg-spin bowler, Sonny Moloney played first-class cricket in New Zealand from 1929 to 1941. His highest first-class score was 190, which he made opening Wellington's innings against Auckland in February 1937. His best bowling figures were 5 for 23 against Cambridge University three months later.

Moloney toured England with the New Zealand team in 1937, playing in all three Test matches. On his debut in the First Test at Lord's he scored 64 in the first innings, adding 104 for the eighth wicket with Alby Roberts. He was one of the most successful players on the tour, making 1463 runs at an average of 34.83 and taking 57 wickets at 26.68 in 26 first-class matches. He captained New Zealand in the match against Sir Julien Cahn's XI in 1938–39.

Moloney was working as an insurance clerk in Dunedin when he enlisted to serve in the Second World War. He was a lieutenant in 20 Infantry Battalion at the time of his death and is buried at El Alamein War Cemetery.

See also
 List of Otago representative cricketers

References

External links

 
 Sonny Moloney at CricketArchive
 Cenotaph Record: Denis Andrew Robert Moloney

1910 births
1942 deaths
Cricketers from Dunedin
People educated at Otago Boys' High School
New Zealand Test cricketers
Canterbury cricketers
Otago cricketers
Wellington cricketers
New Zealand military personnel killed in World War II
South Island cricketers